Charles M. Cioffi (born October 31, 1935) is an American film and television actor best known as Lt. Matt Reardon in Get Christie Love! opposite co-star Teresa Graves.

Born in New York City, he attended Michigan State University, where he became a member of the Sigma Chi fraternity. His film roles include Lt. Vic Androzzi in Shaft (1971), Peter Cable in Klute (1971), and Pop in All the Right Moves (1983).

Cioffi has appeared on Kojak, Frasier, Wings, The X-Files, Thirtysomething, NYPD Blue, Hawaii Five-O, Cannon, Bonanza, and various other series, including The A-Team (1983) as Gianni Christian, and Days of Our Lives, in which he played Ernesto Toscano. He appeared in several productions both on and off Broadway. He made an appearance on Law & Order as mob boss Frank Masucci. He voiced Chairman Prescott and Adam Fenix in the Xbox 360 videogame Gears of War 2.

Filmography

References

External links
 
 
 

1935 births
American male film actors
Michigan State University alumni
American male television actors
Living people
Male actors from New York City
American people of Italian descent